Qalatan may refer to:
 Qalatan, Naqadeh
 Qalatan, Mohammadyar, Naqadeh County